Kentucky Route 6 (KY 6) is a  east–west state highway in Kentucky. The western terminus is at a junction with KY 26, north of Woodbine in Whitley County, and the eastern terminus is at a junction with KY 11 and KY 459 in Barbourville in Knox County.

Route description
KY 6 begins at an intersection with KY 26 in Woodbine, Whitley County, heading southeast as a two-lane undivided road that immediately crosses a CSX railroad line. After the railroad tracks, the route turns to the southwest for a short distance before heading to the southeast along Barbourville Road. KY 6 passes homes and some businesses before leaving Woodbine. The road heads into a mix of fields and woods with some homes, intersecting the southern terminus of KY 3606 before reaching a junction with the northern terminus of KY 1064. The route heads through more rural areas and curves to the east, crossing into Knox County.

KY 6 intersects the southern terminus of KY 3436 and heads southeast into forests, where it passes to the northeast of Wilton Lake. The road heads south before it curves to the southeast. The route turns to the northeast and passes through more woodland with some fields and homes. KY 6 heads east before it continues southeast and intersects the southern terminus of KY 233. The road continues southeast to an intersection with the western terminus of KY 459, at which point it turns to the northeast. The route passes through more forests and winds to the east. Farther east, KY 6 heads into Barbourville and becomes North Main Street, passing homes. The road heads to the southeast and comes to an intersection with the southern terminus of KY 1487. The route passes more residences and some businesses before it heads into the downtown area of Barbourville, where it circles around the Knox County Courthouse on Court Square. KY 6 continues south one block along South Main Street before it comes to its eastern terminus at an intersection with KY 11 and KY 459. Past this intersection, South Main Street continues as part of KY 11.

Major intersections

References

External links

 
 

0006
0006
0006